Rhabdolichops is a genus of glass knifefishes found in Amazon, Orinoco and Maroni basins in tropical South America. They live near the bottom in main river channels, floodplains (including flooded forest like igapó) and lagoons, and are typically found in relatively deep waters.

Rhabdolichops are typically overall grayish, dusky or semi-translucent resulting in whitish/pinkish color. There are two species groups: One (including most species) where the pectoral fins are relatively short and without conspicuous pigmentation, and another (including R. lundbergi and R. nigrimans) where they are relatively long and all dark or dark at the tip. They feed on small invertebrates such as aquatic insect larvae and zooplankton.

Species
There are currently 10 species in this genus:

 Rhabdolichops caviceps (Fernández-Yépez, 1968)
 Rhabdolichops eastwardi Lundberg & Mago-Leccia, 1986
 Rhabdolichops electrogrammus Lundberg & Mago-Leccia, 1986
 Rhabdolichops jegui Keith & Meunier, 2000
 Rhabdolichops lundbergi Correa, Crampton & Albert, 2006
 Rhabdolichops navalha Correa, Crampton & Albert, 2006
 Rhabdolichops nigrimans Correa, Crampton & Albert, 2006
 Rhabdolichops stewarti Lundberg & Mago-Leccia, 1986
 Rhabdolichops troscheli (Kaup, 1856)
 Rhabdolichops zareti Lundberg & Mago-Leccia, 1986

References

Sternopygidae
Fish of South America
Freshwater fish genera
Taxa named by Carl H. Eigenmann